Kevin McDonald (born 23 January 1981 in Rutherglen) is a Scottish former footballer who played in midfield. His most prominent club was Dundee United, where he returned to work as a community coach after ending his playing career.

Career
Having been developed as a player through Dundee United's youth scheme, he turned professional with the club in July 1997. McDonald made his United debut in a League Cup tie at home to Airdrie in September 2000 and appeared as a substitute in the Dundee derby two weeks later. During the derby match, McDonald – who himself suffered concussion and sickness – admitted responsibility for a challenge that saw teammate Jason de Vos wrongly sent off for challenging Fabián Caballero, injuring the Argentine for several months. The fallout from the challenge saw Dundee manager Ivano Bonetti call de Vos "an animal", prompting the Canadian to consider legal action. McDonald failed to make another appearance for United and went on loan to Greenock Morton in January 2001, playing three times for them. In October, McDonald was released from United along with youngsters Blair Sturrock and Gary Middleton.

McDonald captained Scotland's under-15 and under-16 teams.

References

External links

1981 births
Living people
Sportspeople from Rutherglen
Scottish footballers
Scottish Premier League players
Dundee United F.C. players
Greenock Morton F.C. players
Dundee United F.C. non-playing staff
Association football midfielders
Scottish Football League players
Scotland youth international footballers
Ross County F.C. players
Drogheda United F.C. players
Expatriate association footballers in the Republic of Ireland
Footballers from South Lanarkshire